Scott Griffith Aldrich  is an American college basketball coach and lawyer. He is the current head coach of the Longwood Lancers men's basketball team.

Playing career
Aldrich played at Hampden–Sydney under Tony Shaver, where he was team captain his senior year and a part of two NCAA Tournament squads for the Tigers. Aldrich also was a member of the Chi Phi fraternity and was elected to the Phi Beta Kappa and Omicron Delta Kappa honors societies.

Coaching career
After graduation from the University of Virginia School of Law, Aldrich returned to Hampden–Sydney for the 1999–2000 season as an assistant coach, where he assisted in the Tigers' perfect 24–0 regular season, and No. 1 national ranking in Division III. He also served as head coach of the Tigers' cross country team.

Aldrich then entered the private sector for 16 years, while also coaching AAU basketball in the Houston, Texas area. Among the players Aldrich coached in AAU include DeAndre Jordan and Orie Lemon. He returned to college coaching in 2016, joining Hampden–Sydney classmate Ryan Odom's staff at UMBC as the director of basketball operations, and Director of Recruiting/Program Development. Aldrich was part of the Retrievers' historic upset over top-ranked Virginia in the 2018 NCAA Division I men's basketball tournament.

On March 22, 2018, Aldrich was named the ninth head coach in Longwood University program history, replacing Jayson Gee. In his first season, he led the Lancers to their first ever Division I postseason appearance in the 2019 College Basketball Invitational, and was named a finalist for the Joe B. Hall Award (given for most outstanding first-year head coach), which had been won by Odom in 2017. His second season saw Longwood reach fourth place in the Big South Conference, their highest finish in the league since joining in 2012. In July 2021, Aldrich received a contract extension through 2028. At the close of the 2021–22 season, Aldrich was named the Big South Coach of the Year for leading Longwood to the regular season title. Five days later, Longwood won their first ever Big South Conference tournament and earned a bid to the NCAA tournament.

Non-coaching career
Aldrich was a partner at Vinson & Elkins law firm, and also was the founder of an oil and gas company in Texas, as well as a managing director and chief financial officer at a private investment firm.

Head coaching record

Personal life
Aldrich is married to Julie Aldrich. They have three adopted children. Aldrich is a Christian.

References

1970s births
Year of birth missing (living people)
Living people
20th-century American lawyers
21st-century American lawyers
American men's basketball coaches
American men's basketball players
Basketball coaches from Virginia
Basketball players from Virginia
College men's basketball head coaches in the United States
Hampden–Sydney Tigers basketball coaches
Hampden–Sydney Tigers basketball players
Longwood Lancers men's basketball coaches
Texas lawyers
UMBC Retrievers men's basketball coaches
University of Virginia School of Law alumni
Virginia lawyers